The Hobey Baker Award is an annual award given to the top National Collegiate Athletic Association men's ice hockey player. It has been awarded 41 times. It is named for Hall of Famer Hobey Baker, who played college hockey at Princeton University and died shortly after World War I.

The original statue for the award was commissioned and awarded by the Decathlon Athletic Club (now defunct) in Bloomington, Minnesota. The model for the award trophy was Steve Christoff, who played for the University of Minnesota and in the National Hockey League.

Award winners

Winners by school

Winners by place of birth

Winners by position

Award finalists

Finalists by school

See also
 Patty Kazmaier Award – D-I women
 Sid Watson Award – D-III men
 Laura Hurd Award – D-III women
 Hobey Baker Legends of College Hockey Award

References

External links
 

 
College ice hockey player of the year awards in the United States
College ice hockey trophies and awards in the United States
NCAA Division I ice hockey
Princeton Tigers ice hockey
Awards established in 1981
1981 establishments in the United States